Pərdili (also, Pərdi, Pardu, and Pyardili) is a village and municipality in the Jalilabad Rayon of Azerbaijan.  It has a population of 992.

References 

Populated places in Jalilabad District (Azerbaijan)